Zach Metsa (born October 19, 1998) is an American ice hockey defenceman for Quinnipiac University.

Playing career

Junior
Metsa began the 2017–18 season with the Youngstown Phantoms, where he recorded one goal and 12 assists in 37 games. On February 7, 2018, he was traded to the Central Illinois Flying Aces. He finished the season with three goals and eight assists in 23 games for the Flying Aces.

Collegiate
Morrow began his collegiate career for Quinnipiac during the 2018–19 season. During his freshman year he recorded two goals and two assists in 32 games. During the 2019–20 season in his sophomore year he recorded five goals and 12 assists in 34 games.

During the 2020–21 season in his junior year he recorded five goals and 21 assists in 29 games. He was tied for the national lead among defensemen in points and led all defensemen in assists (21), power-play assists (11) and power-play points (14). Following an outstanding season he was named to the All-ECAC First Team. He was also named co-winner of the Coaches' Award, as selected by the men's ice hockey coaching staff.

On May 21, 2021, he was named an assistant captain for the 2021–22 season. During his senior year he recorded 10 goals and 27 assists in 42 games. Metsa and the Bobcats led both the league and the nation in scoring defense, allowing just 0.93 goals per-game. He blocked 24 shots, and led the team during the regular season with 34 points. He ranked in the top three in the nation all season amongst defenseman in points, assists, and plus/minus. Following an outstanding season he was named the ECAC Hockey Best Defensive Defenseman and named to the All-ECAC First Team. He was also named an AHCA East First Team All-American.

Personal life
Metsa was born to Tom Metsa and Lisa Driscoll. His father, Tom, played hockey at Hamline University.

Career statistics

Awards and honors

References

External links
 

1998 births
Living people
AHCA Division I men's ice hockey All-Americans
Ice hockey people from Wisconsin
People from Delafield, Wisconsin
Quinnipiac Bobcats men's ice hockey players
Merritt Centennials players
Sioux Falls Stampede players
Waterloo Black Hawks players
Youngstown Phantoms players
Central Illinois Flying Aces players